Reuven Shari (7 April 1903 – 6 July 1989) was a Russian-born Israeli politician.

Biography
Born Reuven Shraibman in Comrat in the Bessarabia Governorate of the Russian Empire (now in Moldova), Shari received a traditional Hebrew primary education, before attending high school in Chişinău. He later studied law at university and was amongst the founders of the Romanian branch of Tzeiri Zion.

In 1925, he made aliyah to Mandatory Palestine, where he joined the Haganah. He served as secretary of the Kfar Saba Workers Council between 1930 and 1934, and later had spells as secretary of the workers councils of Rehovot (1934–1943) and Jerusalem (1943–1949). During the Siege of Jerusalem in 1948 he was a member of the Jerusalem Committee. In the same year he became a member of Jerusalem City Council, and served as Deputy Mayor until 1951.

In the 1949 elections, Shari was elected to the Knesset on the Mapai list. At that time, he was a member of the party's central committee. On 2 April 1951, he became the country's first ever Deputy Minister, when he was appointed Deputy Minister of Transportation in the second government.

He was re-elected in 1951, but lost his deputy post. In the 1955 elections he lost his Knesset seat. The following year he returned to Jerusalem City Council, but left it in 1958. From 1957 until 1968 he worked in the Ministry of Labour as head of Labour Relations.

Shari also served as Israel's civil service commissioner.

He died in 1989 at the age of 86.

Awards
In 1984, Shari received the Yakir Yerushalayim (Worthy Citizen of Jerusalem) award from the city of Jerusalem.

References

External links

1903 births
1989 deaths
People from Comrat
Moldovan Jews
Romanian emigrants to Mandatory Palestine
Jews in Mandatory Palestine
20th-century Israeli Jews
Haganah members
Israeli civil servants
Mapai politicians
Burials at the Jewish cemetery on the Mount of Olives
Members of the 1st Knesset (1949–1951)
Members of the 2nd Knesset (1951–1955)
Deputy ministers of Israel
Deputy Mayors of Jerusalem